Stefan Wenz (born 15 February 1957) is a German former swimmer. He competed in two events at the 1976 Summer Olympics.

References

1957 births
Living people
German male swimmers
Olympic swimmers of West Germany
Swimmers at the 1976 Summer Olympics
Sportspeople from Frankfurt